Luigi Arditi (16 July 1822 – 1 May 1903) was an Italian violinist, composer and conductor.

Life
Arditi was born in Crescentino, Piemonte (Italy). He began his musical career as a violinist, and studied music at the Milan Conservatory under Bernardo Ferrara (violin) and Nicola Vaccai (composition). He made his debut in 1843 as a director at Vercelli, and it was there that he was made an honorary member of the Philharmonic Academy. Arditi conducted opera throughout Italy and in 1846 found himself conducting as far afield as Havana, Cuba. (This was where he first met Giovanni Bottesini.) He visited America, where he remained for a while, conducting operas in New York, Philadelphia and other cities with the Max Maretzek Italian Opera Company until 1856. Then, following a visit to Constantinople, he decided to settle in London, but made several trips again to America with the Royal Italian Opera Company. He also conducted in Germany, and in other major European cities such as St. Petersburg, Vienna and Madrid. After 1885, he was in England, conducting at Covent Garden and in various prestigious theatres and promenade concerts in London's  parks.

He died at Hove, near Brighton (England); he is buried in Hove Cemetery.

Works
Arditi's best-known operas are: I Briganti, II Corsaro, and La Spia, ("The Spy"). In addition he wrote numerous songs and vocal waltzes, the most popular of which are "Il Bacio" ("The Kiss", dedicated to Marietta Piccolomini, to a text specially written by baritone Gottardo Aldighieri), "Le Tortorelle"  ("The Dove", dedicated to Etelka Gerster), "Se Saran Rose" ("Rosebuds", also titled in English "Love in Springtime", dedicated to Adelina Patti), and "Parla" ("Speak!").

His Inno Turco (1856) for Sultan Abdülmecid I set to a Turkish text was later sung in London during the state visit of Sultan Abdülaziz at Crystal Palace by a British choir of 1600 in July 1867. The world premiere recording of Inno Turco, by Turkish music historian Dr Emre Araci with the Prague Symphony Orchestra and Philharmonic Choir, was released in 2005 by the Brilliant Classics label.

References
Notes

Sources

 Luigi Arditi, My reminiscences, second edition, London, Skeffington, 1896 (accessible for free online at Internet Archive)

External links

Index at arditi.homestead.com
World premiere recording of Inno Turco (1856) is featured on Emre Araci's Euro-Ottomania album released by Brilliant Classics

1822 births
1903 deaths
19th-century classical composers
19th-century conductors (music)
Italian classical composers
Italian classical violinists
Italian conductors (music)
19th-century Italian Jews
Italian male classical composers
Italian male conductors (music)
Italian Romantic composers
Jewish classical composers
Jewish classical violinists
Male classical violinists
People from Crescentino
20th-century Italian male musicians